Anthony Jesus Pineda Alarcon, known professionally as Jestoni Alarcon, is a Filipino actor and politician. He was served as a councilor in Antipolo from 2001 to 2004 and as the vice governor of Rizal Province from 2004 to 2007. In 2013, he won as a board member of the 1st District of Rizal. He is currently the board member of the 1st District of Rizal after winning the 2019 elections. He also received the honorable Eastwood City Walk of Fame star in 2014, for his success and accomplishments in the show business.

Personal life
On December 5, 1991 at 6:00 p.m., he married Lizzette D. Capili. The wedding was held at Manila Cathedral. They have four children including Angela, who is currently an actress under GMA Network's talent agency Sparkle.

Filmography

Film

Television

References

Living people
Adamson University alumni
Filipino actor-politicians
Filipino city and municipal councilors
Filipino male film actors
Filipino people of American descent
Filipino people of Spanish descent
Members of the Rizal Provincial Board
People from Antipolo
People from Quezon City
That's Entertainment (Philippine TV series)
GMA Network personalities
ABS-CBN personalities
Filipino male television actors
Year of birth missing (living people)